Six Ribbons - The Ultimate Collection is a digitally remastered greatest hits album released in May 2011 by Australian musician, Jon English. It includes tracks from his entire career, commencing with his debut single, "Handbags and Gladrags" from 1973.

The album made its ARIA Chart debut in March 2016 at number 23, following his death.

Track listing
CD1

CD2

Charts

Release history

References

Jon English albums
2011 greatest hits albums